Vietnam Rose is a 2005 Philippine television drama series aired on ABS-CBN from September 19, 2005 to February 10, 2006 with a total of 105 episodes. Directed by Joel Lamangan, it stars Maricel Soriano, Assunta de Rossi, Angelica Panganiban, John Estrada and Jason Abalos.

Synopsis
Vietnam Rose follows the journey of Nguyễn Đặng Thiêm Yểu, a Vietnamese woman and survivor of the Vietnam War.  The show's narratives focuses on the consequences of the separation of family members due to the war as opposed to patriotisms associated with it. Yểu went to the Philippines and grew into  Carina Mojica dela Cerna, a successful businesswoman who is married to an influential man (played by John Estrada).

To face her past, she goes back to Vietnam to face her mother. Here, Carina meets her half-sister, Đoàn Đặng Thiên Tín (played by Angelica Panganiban).

Cast and characters

Main cast 
Maricel Soriano as Carina Mojica dela Cerna (Nguyễn Đặng Thiêm Yểu)
John Estrada as Alexander "Alex" dela Cerna
Assunta de Rossi as Adriana (mistress of Alex)
Jason Abalos as JR Hernandez (Enrico's son)
Angelica Panganiban as Đoàn Đặng Thiên Tín
Jay Manalo as Lê Đình Hiền Hoàng (Miguel)

Supporting cast 
Ricky Davao as Enrico Hernandez
Gina Alajar as Amanda Hernandez
AJ Dee as Trần Him Hạnh Trinh
Jim Pebangco as Armando Custodio
Rosa Rosal as Editha dela Cerna
Chanda Romero as Vida Mojica
Ilonah Jean as Emilia Custodio
Tony Mabesa as Fidel dela Cerna
Gilette Sandico as Nguyễn Đặng Thiên Yểu (dying mom)
Baron Geisler as Nguyễn Vũ Phòng Luận Hồi/Billy (Isabel's father/young Vietnamese)
Lollie Mara as Luz
Jang Seo-hee as Bella Nguyễn (Hồi's sister)
Janelle Quintana
Joseph Bitangcol as Paolo Custodio
Michelle Madrigal as Faith dela Cerna

Guest cast 
Kathryn Bernardo as Young Carina dela Cerna
Joshua Dionisio as Young Lê Đình Hiền Hoàng (Miguel)
Luis Alandy as Carina's father
Kristopher Peralta as Young Enrico Hernandez

Awards
Soriano won The 20th PMPC Star Awards for Television Best Actress award for Vietnam Rose.

See also
List of shows previously aired by ABS-CBN
List of ABS-CBN drama series

References

External links

ABS-CBN drama series
2005 Philippine television series debuts
2006 Philippine television series endings
Television shows set in the Philippines
Television shows filmed in Vietnam
Filipino-language television shows
Vietnamese-language television shows